Anna t'Haron is a pen name of Anna Yevdokimova (date of birth: 6 August 1978, place of birth: Chimkent, Kazakh SSR) – a Russian pianist, laureate of the All-Russian and International chamber music and piano-duo competitions. Since 2009 Anna is a grant holder of the "Prins Bernhard Cultuurfonds".
Also, Anna t'Haron working as an artist, web-designer, and Personator (artist and photographer – restorer, image editor and photo-stylist).

Musical biography 
Anna Yevdokimova was born into a musical family. In 1997 she graduated with honour the Piano Department of the S.I.Taneev Musical College in Kaluga. In 1997–2002 she studied with famous Russian musician and pianist, Prof. Victor Merzhanov at the Moscow Conservatory named P.I. Tchaikovsky.
In 2005 Anna graduated with honors (Cum Laude) the Saratov State Conservatory named L.Sobinov (class of Prof. Anatoly Skripay).

In the same 2005 she left for the Netherlands there to continue perfecting her performing mastery. At first in the Conservatorium van Amsterdam with Prof. Naum Grubert and then in ArtEZ Conservatorium Enschede with Prof. Mikhail Markov.

Alongside the saturated concert activity (as a soloist as a chamber music partner with vocalists and instrumentalists) she successfully participated in masters–courses, competitions and different international festivals, such as for example: III All-Russian chamber music and piano-duo competition (Novomoskovsk, Russia, 1997 – Honorary diploma and the competition diploma winner), Almere International Chamber Music Competition (Netherlands, 2007 – Finalist), a concert tour around the Mediterranean countries as a duo "piano-violin" with violinist & duo-partner Ksenia Beltyukova (2007), IV Monographic Rachmaninov International Piano Competition (Moscow, Russia, 2008), "Euregio Musikfestival" (Osnabrück, Germany, 2008), "Val Tidone Summer Camp" (Italy, 2010), etc.
The voluminous concert repertoire of pianist Anna Yevdokimova includes works of the all style directions in the Academic Music practically. Furthermore, she has a special circle of the musical preferences (so-called private, individual repertoire) which includes I.S. Bach, C.Ph.E. Bach, Couperin, Rameau, Mozart, Khanon, Skriabin, Satie and Debussy.

Anna recorded several albums, including CDs: 
2000–2005 "S. Rachmaninov. Preludes – Etudes-Tableaux" (Preludes Op.23, Etudes-Tableaux Op.33).
2005 – "J.S. Bach. Clavier Concertos" (Clavier Concertos BWV 1052, 1053, 1055, 1056).
2007 – "Sonatas for piano and violin. J. Brahms—E. Elgar" (J.Brahms. Sonata for piano and violin No.3 Op.108; E.Elgar. Sonata for piano and violin Op.82 *violin – Ksenia Beltiukova). Limited edition.
2010 – "Golden Stones" (J.S. Bach "Goldberg-Variationen", BWV 988).

Since 2011 Anna Yevdokimova completely stopped performing publicly (concerts, recitals etc.)

Other activities 

As an Artist, Anna t'Haron working in two genres of fine art: Graphics art and her own art direction "multidimensional graphic arts" grounded on the geometry's principles of regular polyhedrons and synthesis of the different fine art's technological ways: from a simple drawing on paper up to a complicated computer-generated image. As an Artist–Personator she participated in decorating books jointly with the author Yuri Khanon: "Two Processes", "The black Alleys"(:de:Allee), "Nietzsche contra Khanon", and "Alphonse Who Did Not Exist".

References

External links

 Pianiste Anna Yevdokimova en een hartstochtelijke Brahms.
   Anna t'Haron-Anna Yevdokimova. Official site – chapter «Portfolio»
   Anna t'Haron-Anna Yevdokimova. Official site –  chapter «Pictures» (with some examples of the «multidimensional graphic arts»)
  Anna t'Haron-Anna Yevdokimova. Official site –  chapter «Repertoire»
  Anna t'Haron-Anna Yevdokimova. Official site –  chapter «Audio»

1978 births
Living people
Dutch classical pianists
Dutch women pianists
Russian classical pianists
Women classical pianists
Russian women pianists
People from Shymkent
Saratov Conservatory alumni
21st-century classical pianists
21st-century women pianists